John Cecil, 5th Earl of Exeter (c. 1648 – 29 August 1700), known as Lord Burghley until 1678, was a British peer and Member of Parliament. He was also known as the Travelling Earl.

Life
Exeter was the son of John Cecil, 4th Earl of Exeter (1628–1678), and Lady Frances Manners. He was educated at Stamford School and St John's College, Cambridge. He was elected to the House of Commons for Northamptonshire in 1675, a seat he held until 1678 when he succeeded his father in the earldom and entered the House of Lords.

He was a notable Grand Tourist and filled his family home, Burghley House, with treasures purchased on his travels in 1679, 1681 and 1699 in Italy. He purchased 300 works of art during his 22 years in Burghley and spent on his last visit to Europe £5,000 (c. £535,000 in 2017 currency).

Lord Exeter married Lady Anne, daughter of William Cavendish, 3rd Earl of Devonshire, in circa 1670, they had nine children. He died in August 1700 and was succeeded in his titles by his son John Cecil, 6th Earl of Exeter.

Eight of these children were:

John Cecil, 6th Earl of Exeter (15 May 1674 – 24 December 1721), known as Lord Burghley from 1678 to 1700. Member of Parliament for Rutland 1695 – 29 August 1700.
Hon. William Cecil (before 1682 – 6 May 1715), 2nd son He was a member of the Order of Little Bedlam aka Bedlam Club, a gentlemen's drinking club, founded in 1684 by John Cecil, 5th Earl of Exeter of Burghley House, and lapsing on his death in 1700. In 1705 it was reconvened by his son, John Cecil, 6th Earl of Exeter as grand master 'Lion', his brother William as 'Panther' and brother Charles as 'Bull'. Member of Parliament for Stamford 1698 – 1705.
Hon. Charles Cecil (c.1683 – 17 March 1726), 3rd son. A member of the Bedlam Club with his brothers. Member of Parliament for Stamford 1705 – 1722.
 Hon. Edward Cecil, 4th son (d. 1723)
Lady Christian Cecil
Lady Ann Cecil
Lady Frances Cecil, died young
Lady Elizabeth Cecil (1687 – 12 June 1708), fourth daughter. Married Charles Boyle, 4th Earl of Orrery. 'By Elizabeth, the beautiful and accomplished daughter of John Cecil, Earl of Exeter, his lordship had only one son, John, fifth Earl of Orrery, his successor. This regretted lady died in the 21st year of her age.'

See also
List of deserters from King James II to William of Orange

References 

 Kidd, Charles, Williamson, David (editors). Debrett's Peerage and Baronetage (1990 edition). New York: St Martin's Press, 1990.
 
 www.thepeerage.com

1640s births
1700 deaths
Barons Burghley
John Cecil, 5th Earl of Exeter
Earls of Exeter
Alumni of St John's College, Cambridge
People educated at Stamford School
Burghley, John Cecil, Lord
17th-century English nobility